Moussa Ould Ghassoum is a former Mauritanian footballer who last managed Djibouti.

Managerial career
In January 2010, Ghassoum was appointed manager of Mauritanian Premier League club Nouadhibou, following a spell at ASC Snim.

On 22 December 2016, Ghassoum was appointed manager of Djibouti.

References

Year of birth missing (living people)
Living people
Mauritanian footballers
FC Nouadhibou players
Djibouti national football team managers
Association footballers not categorized by position
Mauritanian football managers
Mauritanian expatriate football managers
Mauritanian expatriate sportspeople in Djibouti
Expatriate football managers in Djibouti